The List of advocacy groups in Canada includes groups engaged in advocating for a common political, economic, or social interest.

Definition
According to the government of Canada, social advocacy groups "comprises establishments primarily engaged in promoting a particular social or political cause intended to benefit a broad or specific constituency." Some advocacy organizations "solicit contributions or sell memberships to support their activities."

Types of advocacy groups
The government of Canada subdivides advocacy groups into "accident prevention associations, advocacy groups, animal rights organizations, antipoverty advocacy organizations, associations for retired persons, advocacy
civil liberties groups, community action advocacy groups, conservation advocacy groups, drug abuse prevention advocacy organizations, environmental advocacy groups, humane society (advocacy group), natural resource prevention organizations, neighborhood development advocacy groups, peace advocacy groups, public interest groups (e.g., environment conservation, human rights, wildlife), social Service advocacy organizations,
taxpayers advocacy organizations, and tenant advocacy associations." Advocacy groups are further divided into micro (1-4), small (5-99), medium (100-499) and large (500+).

In Bill C-86, Budget Implementation Act, 2018, the federal government adopted recommendations of the Report of the Consultation Panel on the Political Activities of Charities, which affirmed that charitable organizations can engage in public policy dialogue and development activities (PPDDA or P2D2A) that support their charitable purposes. As a result, the Income Tax Act (ITA) was revised to change the "long-standing requirement that charities must be constituted and operated exclusively for charitable purposes." The changes to the ITA now allow charitable organizations in Canada to engage in advocacy in support of its stated charitable purpose(s) but they are not allowed to engage in advocacy for a "political purpose."

Advocacy groups

A

 Abortion Rights Coalition of Canada (ARCC) is a Vancouver, British Columbia-headquartered  pro-choice registered non-profit—but not a charity interest group founded in 2005. It is currently the only political group in Canada which is engaged in pro-abortion activism on a national level.
 Alberta Biodiversity Monitoring Institute (ABMI) (2003 –) a provincial organization funded by the provincial government and the oil and gas industry.
 Alberta Wilderness Association Environment  Ci A rating 2020 
 Alliance of Concerned Jewish Canadians political
 Ancient Forest Alliance political
 Anishinaabe tribal political organizations political
 Anishinabek Nation political
Anti-Corruption and Accountability Canada political
 Anti-Poverty Committee political
 Apathy is Boring political

B
   
 Black Law Students' Association of Canada civil rights
 Black Lives Matter civil rights, political
 Black Action Defence Committee political
 Black United Front civil rights
 Blueprint For Canada Public education K-12 policy platform 
 British Columbia Civil Liberties Association civil rights, political
 Bruce Trail Conservancy Environment, Ci A rating 2020
 Bulgarian National Front political
 Bus Riders Union (Vancouver) political

C

 Calgary Food Bank Social Service > Food banks, Ci A+ rating 2020
 Campaign 2000 political
 Campaign Life Coalition anti-abortion
 Canada's Ecofiscal Commission political
 Canada Strong and Free Network not-for-profit that was formerly the Calgary, Alberta-based Manning Centre, that operates the Manning Foundation, a for-profit think tank that promotes conservative principles
 Canadian Alliance of Student Associations political
 Canadian Anti-racism Education and Research Society civil rights
 Canadian Bankers Association political
 Canadian Centre for Bio-Ethical Reform anti-abortion
 Canadian Civil Liberties Association civil rights, political
 Canadian Council for Refugees political
 Canadian Council of Natural Mothers political
 Canadian Federation of Independent Business political
 Canadian Injured Workers Alliance political
 Canadian Jewish Congress (CJC) (1919–2011), which was affiliated with the World Jewish Congress was headquartered in Ottawa. It was a subsidiary of the Centre for Israel and Jewish Affairs—the Canadian Council for Israel and Jewish Advocacy—in 2007 and was disbanded in 2011. The JCC was the main advocacy group for the Jewish community in Canada from 1919 to 2011, advocating for human rights, social equality, Canadian immigration reform and civil and political rights in Canada.
 Canadian Jewish Political Affairs Committee political
 Canadian Nationalist Party anti-abortion
 Canadian Radio League political
 Canadian Snowbird Association political
 Canadian Wildlife Federation is an Ottawa-based Canadian non-profit organization founded in 1961 whose mandate is wildlife conservation in Canada.
 Canadian Youth for Choice abortion rights
 Canadians for Equal Marriage LGBT (Lesbian, Gay, Bisexual, Transgender) rights
 Canadians for Justice and Peace in the Middle East political
 Catholic Civil Rights League anti-abortion
 Catholic Medical Association anti-abortion
 Catholic Organization for Life and Family anti-abortion
 Centre for Israel and Jewish Affairs political
 Center for Research-Action on Race Relations civil rights
 Charity Intelligence Canada (Ci)  charity watchdog, charity assessment
 Citizens Centre for Freedom and Democracy political
 Citizens for a Canadian Republic political
 Citizens for Public Justice political
 Coalition Against the Marcos Dictatorship political
 Committee on Monetary and Economic Reform political
 Community Air political
 Council of Alberta University Students political

D

 David Suzuki Foundation environmental

E
 Ecojustice Environment, Ci A rating 2020
 East York Learning Experience Education, Ci A rating 2020

 Egale Canada LGBT rights
 Electronic Frontier Canada political

F

 Fair Vote Canada  (FVC) is a Kitchener, Ontario-based grassroots, nonprofit, multi-partisan citizens' movement—created in June 2001—that calls for the replacement of the first-past-the-post electoral system with proportional representation, as part of electoral reform in Canada.
 Friends of Canadian Broadcasting political
 Focus on the Family Canada anti-abortion
 Foundation for Equal Families LGBT rights

G

 Gay Alliance Toward Equality LGBT rights
 Gay Liberation Front LGBT rights
 Generation Squeeze political
 Generation Screwed political

I

 Independent Jewish Voices (Canada) political
 Indspire Education, Ci A rating 2020
 International Conservation Fund of Canada Environment, Ci A rating 2020
 International Railroad for Queer Refugees LGBTQ rights
 Iranian Queer Organization LGBT rights
 The Isaac Foundation patients rights

J

 Justice Centre for Constitutional Freedoms political

L

 Lambda Foundation LGBT rights
 Law Union of Ontario civil rights
 LGBTory LGBT rights
 Leadnow political
 League for Social Reconstruction political
 Liberals for Life anti-abortion
 Life Chain anti-abortion
 Ligue des droits et libertés civil rights

M

 MADD Canada political
 Maquila Solidarity Network political
 MiningWatch Canada political
 Monarchist League of Canada political
 Modern Miracle Network pro-fossil fuel, political

N

 National Action Committee on the Status of Women abortion rights,
 National Citizens Coalition  (NCC) is a Canadian conservative lobby group, founded in 1967, that has "promoted freedom" for fifty years. The Coalition supports smaller government, cuts to social spending, abolition of medicare, extra-billing by doctors, lower taxes for the wealthy and is against public sector unions. The Coalition was successful in persuading Justice Medhurst of the Alberta Supreme Court to strike down the 1983 federal restrictions on non-party campaign expenditures as an interference with freedom of expression. The NCC spent hundreds of thousands of dollars to help Conservatives win the 1984 federal election, the first Conservative majority government in 30 years. 
 National Council of Canadian Muslims civil rights
 NATO Association of Canada political

O

 Ontario Autism Coalition political
 Online Rights Canada political
 Ontario Coalition Against Poverty political
 Ontario Health Coalition political
 OpenMedia political
 Option citoyenne political
 Option consommateurs political

P

 Pathways to Education Education, Ci A+ rating 2020
 Pembina Institute 
 PFLAG Canada LGBT rights
 Pilgrims of Saint Michael political
 Polaris Institute political
 Pro-Choice Action Network abortion rights
 Pro-Life Alberta Political Association anti-abortion
 Progress Alberta is an Edmonton-based non-profit with Duncan Kinney as executive director that was formed in January 2016 to support progressive policies in Alberta. Progress Alberta receives funding from Canadian labour unions as well as from individual supporters.
 Progressive Group for Independent Business political
 ProudPolitics LGBT rights

Q

 Queers Against Israeli Apartheid LGBT rights

R

 Rainbow Railroad LGBT rights
 Raging Grannies political
 REAL Women of Canada anti-abortion, political
 Rideau Institute political
 RightOnCanada.ca political
 Right to Privacy Committee LGBT rights
 Rock for Choice abortion rights

S

 Samara (charitable organisation) political
 Sex Professionals of Canada political
 SoChange political

T

 The Compass Social Service > Food banks, Ci A rating 2020
 Toronto Environmental Alliance political
 Toronto Public Space Committee political
 Transparency International Canada political
 Transport Action Canada political

U

 United Nations Association in Canada political

V

 Voice of Canadians political
 Voices-Voix political
 Vote Marriage Canada political

W
 WE Charity 
 Wildrose Party of Alberta political
 World Federalist Movement-Canada political
 World Vision Canada International aid, Ci A+ rating 2020

Y

 You Can Play LGBT rights

References

Civil rights organizations in Canada
LGBT political advocacy groups in Canada
Political advocacy groups in Canada
Lists of organizations based in Canada